Ann Jillian is an American sitcom television series created by Deidre Fay and Stuart Wolpert, starring Ann Jillian that aired on NBC from November 30, 1989, to August 19, 1990.

Plot
After the death of her firefighter husband, Ann McNeil, an ex-Radio City Music Hall Rockette, and her 14-year-old daughter Lucy, move from New York to a small northern California village named Marvel, where Ann and her husband went for their honeymoon. Lucy is apprehensive of her new surroundings in a new town and at first misses the fast-paced atmosphere of New York City, but she begins to adjust and makes new friends. Ann is also learning to adjust as well as she starts a new job at a gift shop run by Mrs. Hufnagel. The teens that Lucy hangs out with were Kaz, Melissa, and Robin. Kaz's well-meaning grandfather, Duke, helped Ann and Lucy in their new surroundings.

Cast and characters
Ann Jillian as Ann McNeil
Lisa Rieffel as Lucy McNeil
Noble Willingham as Duke Howard
Cynthia Harris as Sheila Hufnagel
Zachary Rosencrantz as Kaz Sumner
Chantal Rivera-Batisse as Melissa Santos
Amy Lynne as Robin Winkle

Production
The pilot for the series was produced in early 1989, when it was called The Ann Jillian Show. Retitled Ann Jillian, it premiered as a series on NBC on November 30, 1989, running for 7 episodes before it was put on hiatus in January.  The series returned briefly in August 1990, running three additional episodes before being cancelled after a final broadcast on August 19.  Three further episodes had been produced, but never aired.

At the time the pilot for the series was produced, Castle Rock Entertainment, which produced the show, also had another pilot produced for NBC named The Seinfeld Chronicles starring stand-up comedian Jerry Seinfeld. When it tested poorly, and Ann Jillian tested more positively, Castle Rock committed to Jillian's series, which was picked up for a full season order. However, the show would only last one season, whereas the subsequently re-titled Seinfeld lasted for nine seasons, ending in 1998, becoming among the most successful sitcoms in television history.

Episodes

Reception
Howard Rosenberg of Los Angeles Times reviewed the comedy negatively, quipping that the series "has more Anns than laughs."

References

External links

1980s American sitcoms
1990s American sitcoms
1989 American television series debuts
1990 American television series endings
English-language television shows
NBC original programming
Television series by Warner Bros. Television Studios
Television series by Castle Rock Entertainment
Television shows set in California